Haberlandia otfriedi is a moth in the family Cossidae. It is found in Ghana. The habitat consists of rainforests.

The wingspan is about 17 mm for males and 20 mm for females. The male forewings are colonial buff with buffy olive lines. The hindwings are colonial buff with a reticulated buffy olive pattern. Females have deep colonial buff forewings with lines of Isabella colour. The hindwings are deep colonial buff with a reticulated Isabella colour pattern.

Etymology
The species is named in honour of Dr Otfried Lange.

References

Natural History Museum Lepidoptera generic names catalog

Endemic fauna of Ghana
Moths described in 2011
Metarbelinae
Taxa named by Ingo Lehmann